Pempteurys sericans is a species of beetle in the family Cerambycidae, the only species in the genus Pempteurys.

References

Anaglyptini